Sphagoeme sahlbergi is a species of beetle in the family Cerambycidae. It was described by Per Olof Christopher Aurivillius in 1893.

References

Oemini
Beetles described in 1893